Willis Lee Barnes (October 22, 1900 – March 22, 1976) was an American football, basketball, track and field, and boxing coach.  He served as the head football coach at the University of New Mexico from 1942 to 1946, compiling a record of 45–35–10.  Barnes was also the head basketball coach at New Mexico from 1941 to 1943, tallying a mark of 12–30.  Barnes came to the University of New Mexico in 1937 as an assistant football coach.

Head coaching record

Football

References

External links
 

1900 births
1976 deaths
Arizona State Sun Devils football coaches
New Mexico Lobos football coaches
New Mexico Lobos men's basketball coaches
College boxing coaches in the United States
College track and field coaches in the United States